The Italy national swimming team represents Italy in International swimming competitions such as Olympic Games or World swimming Championships.

History
The national Italian swimming team participated to all the Summer Olympics editions, from London 1908, 25 times on 29.

Medal tables

Swimming 
(not included open water swimming)
 update to last edition

Olympic Games

Swimming
The Italian national swimming team won its first medal at 1972 Summer Olympics with Novella Calligaris.

Open water
Open water swimming was introduced at Beijing 2008.

World Championships

Long course

Update after Budapest 2022.

Short course
Update after 2022 Melbourne.

European Championships

This table is of swimming pool events, it excludes open water events. See LEN official report.

Update after day 7 (17 August) of the Rome 2022 swimming program (complete).

note 1: in italic to update.
note 2: Where it is reported half medal refers to those assigned in mixed relays from 2014 for the first time.

Multiple medalists

Updated to 2022 FINA World Swimming Championships (25 m).

Men
Paltrinieri open water medals are not included.

Women

Olympic Games
The list refers to individual and team events and include men and women (in pink color), sorted by number of individual titles.

See also
Italy at the Olympics
Italy at the World Aquatics Championships
Italy at the European Aquatics Championships
Italy national diving team
List of Italian records in swimming
Swimming Summer Olympics medal table
Swimming World Championships medal table

References

External links
 Italy swimming at Summer Olympics
 Official site of the Italian Swimming Federation 

Swimming
Swimming in Italy